Srđan Darmanović (born July 18, 1961 in Cetinje) is a Montenegrin politician, diplomat and professor at University of Montenegro Faculty of Political Sciences. He was the Ministry of Foreign Affairs and European Integration of Montenegro from 28 November 2016 to 2 December 2020.

Biography

Academic career
Darmanović was one of the founders of the University of Montenegro Faculty of Political Sciences in 2006, and the first dean of the faculty until 2010 when he was appointed ambassador of Montenegro to United States of America. He is currently active as an associate professor at the same faculty.

Political career
From 10 November 2010 to November 2016 he served as Montenegrin ambassador to the United States. At 28 November 2016, he was appointed as the Minister of Foreign Affairs and European Integration of Montenegro in the Cabinet of Duško Marković, succeeding Igor Lukšić. He is an independent politician affiliated with the then-ruling Democratic Party of Socialists.

References

1961 births
Living people
Politicians from Cetinje
Democratic Party of Socialists of Montenegro politicians
Academic staff of the University of Montenegro
Foreign Ministers of Montenegro